María Concepción Bautista Fernández (born 27 October 1936), better known as Conchita Bautista, is a Spanish singer and actress, best known for her participation in the Eurovision Song Contests of  and .

Bautista moved from her native Andalusia to Madrid in her teens and quickly established herself as an actress, appearing in a number of films in the 1950s. At the same time she was earning a reputation as an interpreter of Andalusian music and gained a recording contract with the Columbia label.

In 1961, Bautista took part in the selection for Spain's debut Eurovision entry with the song "Estando contigo" ("Being with You"), which was chosen as the country's representative for the sixth Eurovision Song Contest, held in Cannes, France, on 18 March.  "Estando contigo" was drawn as the contest's opening song, and at the end of voting had placed ninth of the 16 entries.

In 1965, Bautista came through a very convoluted selection process to win the Spanish Eurovision ticket a second time with "Qué bueno, qué bueno" ("How Good, How Good"), and went forward to that year's Eurovision which took place on 20 March in Naples.

In later years, Bautista forged a successful recording and touring career in Latin America, Italy, Greece, and Turkey as well as in Spain.

Selected filmography

References

External links 
 Biography (Spanish)

Spanish women singers
Eurovision Song Contest entrants for Spain
Eurovision Song Contest entrants of 1961
Eurovision Song Contest entrants of 1965
Spanish film actresses
People from Seville
1936 births
Living people
Singers from Andalusia